The 2011 Swiss Figure Skating Championships took place between 9 and 11 December 2010 at the Bossard Arena in Zug. Skaters competed in the disciplines of men's singles, ladies' singles, pair skating, and ice dancing on the senior level. The results were used to choose the Swiss teams to the 2011 World Championships and the 2011 European Championships.

Results

Men

Ladies

Pairs

Ice dance

External links
 2011 Championships

2011
2010 in figure skating
2011 in figure skating